Manuel Leindekar Virginio (born 23 April 1997 in Montevideo) is a Uruguayan rugby player for Oyonnax Rugby in Pro D2, the second highest level of French rugby.  His primary position is lock.

Club career
Leindekar started his career playing in Uruguay for Old Boys.

In December 2015, he went to France to sign a new contract with Oyonnax Rugby.

International career
Leindekar made his international debut for Uruguay on 13 May 2017, in a South American Rugby Championship game against Paraguay.

He was selected for Uruguay's 31 man squad for the 2019 Rugby World Cup on 30  August 2019.

References

External links
 

1997 births
Living people
Uruguayan rugby union players
Oyonnax Rugby players
Rugby union locks
Expatriate rugby union players in France
Uruguay international rugby union players
People educated at The British Schools of Montevideo